Pinkberry is a franchise of frozen dessert restaurants headquartered in Scottsdale, Arizona. There are currently over 260 stores in 20 countries. The first store was opened in January 2005 by Hye Kyung (Shelly) Hwang and Young Lee. The restaurant allows customers to customize their yogurt with a variety of toppings.

History 

Hwang's first business venture was to open a formal English teahouse on a tiny residential street called Huntley Drive in West Hollywood, California. However, after the city refused to approve an alcohol permit for Hwang and her business partner, architect Young Lee, they decided to go with their second plan, which was a frozen yogurt concept reviving the craze of the 1980s. People were soon driving across town and standing in line for up to 20 to 30 minutes to get their fix of "the taste that launched 1,000 parking tickets." The second store opened in August 2006 and the third one on La Brea and Melrose avenues in early September 2006. After, stores began springing up all over Southern California and also branches in New York. In October 2009, Pinkberry opened its first overseas branch in the State of Kuwait at the Avenues shopping mall.

On October 16, 2007, the firm took in a $27.5 million investment from Maveron, the venture fund founded by Starbucks founder Howard Schultz, to expand the firm's concept nationwide.  

On May 1, 2009, Pinkberry announced its plans to expand its market both internationally and domestically, after receiving $9 million in second-round funding from investors. As part of its plans, Pinkberry has partnered with Kuwaiti retail conglomerate M.H. Alshaya Co. to open stores in several countries in the Middle East and signed with HMSHost to open locations in airports nationwide, the first of which will open in the late summer 2009. In 2010, the company expanded in the Southern United States.  In April 2010, the original Pinkberry store in West Hollywood, still lacking adequate parking, was closed and converted into an administrative building for the chain.

After poor sales and several store closures from over-expansion, in 2015 Kahala Brands acquired Pinkberry as their 18th brand. There is no information on how much co-founders Hwang and Lee received upon selling Pinkberry to Kahala Brands in December 2015. Currently, Shelly Hwang is the Chief Product Officer and Board Director of Pinkberry.

Branding and placement 
The Pinkberry brand has been designed and managed by LA-based branding firm Ferroconcrete. Pinkberry has been featured in an episode of HBO's Curb Your Enthusiasm (season 8, episode 5, 'Vow of Silence') and in an episode of 2021’s “And Just Like That” (season 1, episode 3, ‘When in Rome’). Mentioned in the Comedy Central cartoon Ugly Americans (season 2, episode 9, 'Lilly and the Beast'), mentioned in two episodes of the TBS animated sitcom American Dad (season 6, episode 17, 'Home Wrecker' and season 11, episode 2, 'The Life Aquatic with Steve Smith'), and in a few scenes of the 2014 film Still Alice. Pinkberry was featured in the Broadway musical Be More Chill (musical).
Mentioned in the noval November 9 by Colleen Hoover. Mentioned in the 2014 film Horrible Bosses 2.

Controversy 

Originally marketed as frozen yogurt, Pinkberry has faced complaints that its product is fraudulent because it does not meet the California Department of Food and Agriculture's definition of frozen yogurt because it does not contain the necessary amount of bacterial cultures per ounce. The Los Angeles Times sent samples of Pinkberry's product to a lab and revealed that Pinkberry did contain active yogurt cultures, but it does not contain the minimum amount of culture to call itself frozen yogurt, according to California state law. According to the Los Angeles Times, Pinkberry's product had 69,000 bacterial cultures per gram, compared to 200,000 for Baskin-Robbins. The National Yogurt Association (NYA) established its own criteria for live and active culture yogurt. For manufacturers to carry their Live and Active Culture seal, refrigerated yogurt products must contain at least 100 million cultures per gram at the time of manufacture, and frozen yogurt products must contain 10 million cultures per gram at the time of manufacture. This level was based on a survey of leading research scientists involved in clinical studies of the health attributes associated with live and active culture yogurt.

Pinkberry appears to have altered its dessert recipe and has now earned the right to call its product real yogurt.  Pinkberry officially received the Live and Active Cultures Seal from the National Yogurt Association on April 17, 2008, almost 3 years after the initial "real yogurt" lawsuit was filed.

The Pinkberry jingle heard on its website is sung by the 1980s musician Tigra, from L'Trimm. Apparently in response to the recent lawsuit against Pinkberry claiming that its product is not "real yogurt", for a while Pinkberry had removed all lyrics to this jingle on its website except for the word "Pinkberry", which repeats over and over again at the chorus (prior to this change, the jingle had lyrics that characterized Pinkberry's product as "yogurt", and compared its product as better than ice cream).

The unproven health benefits attributed to yogurt that were previously posted on the walls of Pinkberry (e.g., cures colon cancer, fights yeast infections) have been removed.

See also
 List of frozen dessert brands

References

Bibliography

Further reading

External links 
Official website
Official international website

Frozen yogurt businesses
Fast-food chains of the United States
Brand name frozen desserts
Regional restaurant chains in the United States
Restaurants established in 2005
2005 establishments in California
Restaurants in Greater Los Angeles